Monte Santa Croce is a mountain in Liguria, northern Italy, part of the Ligurian Apennines.

References

Mountains of Liguria
Mountains of the Apennines
Metropolitan City of Genoa